German–Kenyan relations are bilateral relations between Germany and Kenya.

History

Germany was the first country to recognise Kenya on independence. Both countries enjoy warm relations.

High-level Visits
In February 2020, President Frank-Walter Steinmeier visited Nairobi and held talks with President Uhuru Kenyatta. The visit centered on increasing cooperation in education and technology transfer.

In July 2011, German Chancellor Angela Merkel visited Kenya. She held talks with President Mwai Kibaki and Prime Minister Raila Odinga. The Chancellor was on a tour to begin the newly incepted 'Afrika-Konzept'.

In 1966, President Heinrich Lübke of West Germany visited Nairobi.

In 2014, the former Foreign Cabinet Secretary of Kenya, Amina Mohamed met with then Foreign Affairs Minister Frank-Walter Steinmeier in Berlin.

In the same year, Former President of Germany, Horst Köhler led a trade delegation to Nairobi. He also held talks with President Uhuru Kenyatta.

Germany is usually the third or fourth largest source of tourists to Kenya. Germany unlike other European countries restrained itself from issuing travel advisories to Kenya.

Development cooperation
German development cooperation from 2014 to 2016 is said to be worth KES. 14.6 billion (EUR. 138 million).

Key areas for Kenya and Germany are:
Agriculture (focusing on food security and drought resilience)
Development of the water and sanitation sector
Support for the health sector
Good governance (tackling corruption and improving transparency and accountability)
Renewable energy and energy efficiency
Education
 
Official Development Assistance (ODA) for Kenya amounts up to KES. 24.08 billion (EUR. 227 million) annually (2011/2012). Germany is Kenya's second largest financial donor. Numerous German political foundations also have a Kenyan office.

Trade
Germany is Kenya's third largest export market in Europe after the UK and the Netherlands.

In 2019, Kenya exported goods worth KES. 11.28 bn (EUR. 100 million). Germany exported goods worth KES. 44.4 bn (EUR. 400 million).

In 2013, Kenya exported goods worth KES. 8.24 billion (EUR. 78 million) to Germany. Germany exported goods worth KES. 37.49 billion (EUR. 354 million) to Kenya.

Kenya and Germany signed an agreement to avoid double taxation in 1977.

FDI
Companies such as BASF and Lufthansa Cargo have operations in Kenya. Over 60 German companies have invested more than KES. 9 billion (EUR. 86 million) in Kenya.

Diplomatic missions
Kenya had diplomatic relations with West Germany and the embassy was located in Bonn. After the unification of East and West Germany, the embassy moved to Berlin.

Germany has an embassy in Nairobi.

External links
Embassy of Germany, Nairobi 
Embassy of Kenya, Germany

References

 
Kenya
Germany